Gennady Afanasievich Ustyugov (born March 18, 1937) is a Russian artist and poet, representative of the unofficial art of Leningrad in the 1970–1980s.

Biography
Ustyugov was born in 1937 in Tokmok, Frunze Oblast, Kirghiz SSR. His father is a carpenter, originally from Vyatka, his mother is a seamstress from Samara.

Since the late 1960s, Ustyugov was actively engaged in painting, and in 1974 he participated in the legendary Gazanevskyб was a member of the Association of Experimental Exhibitions and the Association of Experimental Fine Arts. At this time, he was friends with Oleg Grigoriev and Mikhail Shemyakin. In 1990, the first solo exhibition of Gennady Ustyugov was held at the Museum of Urban Sculpture in St. Petersburg.

Ustyugov's works are kept in Hermitage Museum, Russian Museum, A.S. Popov Central Museum of Communications, museums of Murmansk, Novosibirsk, Yaroslavl, Nabokov House and others.

He was not married and has no children. Ustyugov was diagnosed with schizophrenia.

References

External links
 Я – странник одинокий
 Геннадий Устюгов. Я – художник

Russian contemporary artists
21st-century Russian painters
20th-century Russian painters
Russian male painters
Soviet painters
Soviet male poets
Russian male poets
People from Chüy Region
Living people
1937 births
20th-century Russian male artists
21st-century Russian male artists